Tombouctou Region (Bambara: ߕߎߡߎߕߎ ߘߌߣߋߖߊ tr. Tumutu Dineja) is one of the administrative regions of Mali. For administrative purposes, the region is subdivided into five cercles.

The region is part of northern Mali that was separated and declared independent by the National Movement for the Liberation of Azawad (MNLA) during the Tuareg rebellion of 2012. In the course of the conflict, the MNLA lost control of the territory to Islamist militias.

Tombouctou Region is world-famous for its capital, the ancient city Timbuktu, synonymous to 19th-century Europeans with an elusive, hard-to-reach destination. The city gained fame in 1390 when its ruler, Mansa Musa, went on a pilgrimage to Mecca, stopping with his entourage in Egypt and dispensing enough gold to devalue the Egyptian currency. This started the legend of a city in the interior of Africa, where roads were said to be paved with gold and buildings topped with roofs of gold.

History

The city is located at the southern edge of the Sahara, near the Niger River, which has headwaters in the highlands very near the Atlantic coast before its long  journey to the north east, before finally turning south to reach the Atlantic. The riches of the kingdom were due to Tombouctou's position as the southern terminus of the trans-Saharan trade in gold, salt, kola nuts, copper and slaves.

Timbuktu's decline began with the capture of the city by Morocco in 1592. Many Islamic scholars were dispersed, some to Morocco. Morocco had difficulty holding onto the city, as the supply lines were long compared to the closer kingdoms vying for dominance of the region. Ultimately, however, it was the rise of sea trade along the West Africa coast that doomed the overland routes that connected North Africa to sub-Saharan Africa. The city lost its economic base and its fine university was not enough to save Timbuktu from decline.

Cut off from major trade routes, the city retained an aura of spectacular treasure. When French explorers rediscovered the city in 1815 they were disappointed to find a sand-blown city of low mud buildings.

The region was marginalized under French colonial control, which ended in 1960. The French opened up shorter trade routes to the Atlantic, cutting into the trans-Sahara trading economy and people in the city.

In early 2012, the National Movement for the Liberation of Azawad and other militant groups opposed to the government of Mali swept through the region, entering Timbuktu without a fight after making a deal with local Arab militias. On 6 April 2012, the region was declared independent from Mali as part of the new country of Azawad. However, Mali refused to acknowledge the Azawadi Declaration of Independence, and the international community continues to recognise Bamako's claim to the region.

Administrative subdivisions
The region is divided into five cercles:

The larger parts of Timbuktu and Goundam cercles (323,326 km² with about 134,000 inhabitants) were separated in 2016 to form the new Taoudenit Region.

See also
 Regions of Mali
 Cercles of Mali

References

External links

 

 
Regions of Mali
Azawad